Document preparation system can refer to several things:

 A typesetting system
 A word processor